Six Flags New England, formerly known as Gallup's Grove (1870–1886), Riverside Grove (1887–1911), Riverside Park (1912–1995) and Riverside: The Great Escape (1996–2000), is an amusement park located in Agawam, Massachusetts, a western suburb of Springfield, Massachusetts. Opening in the late 19th century, it is the oldest amusement park in the Six Flags chain, acquired by Premier Parks in 1996 and rebranded Six Flags New England in 2000. Superman The Ride is among the park's most notable rides, having appeared as a highly ranked roller coaster in the annual Golden Ticket Awards from Amusement Today since the ride opened in 2000.

History

Throughout much of the 20th century, the park was known as Riverside Park. It began as a picnic grove in 1870 named Gallup's Grove. It was briefly changed to Riverside Grove, and then eventually Riverside Park in 1912. Prior to 1900, most of the park's patrons arrived via steamship. The Springfield Street Railway extended its line to the park in 1900 and, although Riverside was at the end of the Springfield Street Railway, it was not owned by the railway and is, therefore, not considered a trolley park, contrary to published reports.

In the early 1900s, a few mechanical rides and a carousel were added. The park was purchased in 1911 by Henry J. Perkins who transformed the park from a picnic grove to an amusement park. He built the park's first roller coaster, The Giant Dip, in 1912, which proved to be so popular that another coaster, The Greyhound, was added in 1915. Under Perkins' ownership, the park continued to prosper and additional amusements were added, including a 300-foot-diameter pool that became known as Lake Takadip. The original Giant Dip coaster was replaced in 1920 by a new, more thrilling coaster that was twice the size of the Giant and was eventually named Lightning. A third coaster, Whirlwind Racer, was added in 1928.

Closure and re-opening

The Wall Street Crash of 1929 took its toll on the park and by 1931 it had gone into foreclosure. For the 1932 season, the park operated only Wednesday through Sunday, and in 1933 it closed. Several attempts to reopen the park failed and it remained closed through 1939, although the grounds were occasionally used for company picnics. A drive-in movie theater operated in the parking lot from 1937 to 1939.

Edward Carroll Sr. purchased the abandoned park in 1939 and after making improvements, reopened Riverside Park on May 29, 1940. Carroll is credited with rescuing Riverside and turning it into the largest theme park in New England. He purchased the plans and cars of the 1939 New York World's Fair Cyclone Roller Coaster and opened a new coaster in 1941. That coaster, now known as Thunderbolt, is operating at the park and is the oldest coaster — in its original location — within the entire Six Flags chain of theme parks. The park continued to add new rides and removed some older ones. The theater and bowling alley were removed in the late 1950s, making Riverside Park a seasonal attraction.

Carroll took a liking to auto racing, a sport that was gaining popularity in the Northeast after World War II, and added it to his slate of attractions at Riverside, building the Riverside Park Speedway in 1948, replacing an open-air bandstand. The 1960s was a popular period for stock car racing at Riverside Park. NASCAR began to hold events at Riverside Park Speedway in 1976. in 1968 the park added its first steel coaster called the Wildcat and In 1977, Riverside Park added its first looping roller coaster, The Loop Coaster, later known as Black Widow. The park continued to be successful throughout the 1970s. In 1979 the park invested in an Arrow Development log flume known as Red River Rapids. It became the park's first water ride. It was later renamed Poland Spring Plunge. By the 1980s, the park stopped selling individual ride tickets and began charging a "pay one price" admission.

Six years after the opening of Black Widow, the Wildcat was removed and moved to the late Rocky Point Park in Rhode Island. In 1983, Riverside Park added its third roller coaster, which was also the park's second wooden coaster. The owners originally wanted a coaster exactly like the Coney Island Cyclone, but space was limited, so the coaster would need to take up less space and would have sharper twists and turns. It became known as the Riverside Cyclone. In 1987, Riverside attempted to build a white-water rafting ride called the Lost River Water Ride. Plagued with problems, the attraction never opened and was subsequently abandoned. A majority of the ride was demolished in 1989 to make way for Wild River Falls, a waterslide complex consisting of three sets of slides: Riptide, Blue Lightning and Pipeline. A popular attraction, Wild River Falls remained in operation until the opening of the Island Kingdom Waterpark in 1997.

In 1994, Riverside partnered with Lady Luck Gaming in a proposal to build a hotel and dockside casino complex at the park, one of several competing casino proposals in the state. The plan died after Agawam voters rejected a non-binding referendum in support of casino gambling in November.

Purchase by Premier Parks
During the 1996 season, the track on the Musik Express was damaged and the attraction remained closed for a portion of the year. A Chance Chaos was ordered and was scheduled to open for the 1997 season. During the winter of 1996, the Carroll family was approached by Premier Parks of Oklahoma City, Oklahoma, which subsequently purchased the park. Premier Parks renamed the park as Riverside: The Great Escape.

Under Premier Parks, various changes were made to the park. For the 1997 season, the new owners invested more than $20 million on general improvements and several new attractions. Attractions included the Island Kingdom Waterpark, which featured a children's water play area, various slides and a wave pool. Other attractions included Mind Eraser (later renamed to The Riddler Revenge) and Shipwreck Falls. In the process of renovation, some older rides such as the Bayern Kurve were removed. Main Street U.S.A. was substantially redesigned, and the Southern Center midway was themed to a 1950s city and renamed Rockville. Other improvements included a new entrance plaza and the carousel being renovated and relocated to the front gate.

In 1998, the park added several attractions including a lazy river, another children's play structure named Hook's Lagoon, a speed slide tower called Cannonball, a family raft slide named Swiss Family Tobaggan and a multi-slide tower called Big Kahuna. The water park expansion was added to the south end of the park next to the park's log flume. The park also added The Hellevator, an S&S Worldwide Turbo Drop tower measuring 21 stories tall, which was originally painted red.

Six Flags
On April 1, 1998, Premier Parks acquired the larger Six Flags chain of parks from Time Warner. The park continued to be known as "Riverside" until the end of the 1999 season. In 1999, the Riverside Park Speedway was removed and the waterpark was doubled in size. Additions included a new slide tower named Shark Attack and a second wave pool called Hurricane Bay. The park added a Hopkins river raft ride named Blizzard River to the North End, replacing a set of dry slides and the old Bumper Cars. Blizzard River was themed to incorporate the Penguin character from the Batman franchise, but the name of the ride was never changed when the park was allowed to use characters from DC Comics on their rides. A new western area called Crack Axle Canyon was added and included four rides, three of which were new to the park. In 2000, Riverside was rebranded "Six Flags New England", reflecting similar changes made at other Six Flags properties. The main street running through the park was renamed "Carroll Drive" in honor of the family that had owned the place for much of its history. The park added a new front gate plaza. On the former site of the racetrack, a new DC Comics-themed section of the park was installed. The area featured several new rides, including Superman – Ride of Steel, a hypercoaster designed by Intamin. And the park added a third coaster called flashback which replaced the Black Widow and Rotor in the north end. Flashback was actually built on the site of the kiddie coaster rolling thunder. Rolling thunder now named great chase replaced the aging Rickie little twister coaster. In 2000. The Poland Spring Plunge log flume ride was removed in 2005 and replaced with Splashwater Falls in 2006.

In 2008, Six Flags New England was to open The Dark Knight Coaster, an indoor MACK Wild Mouse coaster based on the upcoming film of the same name. The park's other Batman-based attraction had its name briefly changed from Batman – The Dark Knight to Batman: The Ride to avoid confusion. However, due to apparent permit issues, the ride was canceled and dismantled, being sent to Six Flags Mexico, which built it in their park. The ride would have cost the park $7.5 million in exchange for bringing $280,000 in taxes for the state of Massachusetts. The cancellation angered the city of Agawam, which stated that issues with the ride were not evident. The park then announced the new "Glow in the Park Parade". This paved the way for many future roller coasters in the park.

The 2010 season brought about the addition of a new children's area: Mr. Six's Splash Island located in Hurricane Harbor. This increased the number of children's areas in the park to four. In 2011, Gotham City Gauntlet: Escape From Arkham Asylum opened up in the DC Superhero Adventure section of the park. This ride replaced the football field and was placed on the same plot of land that the canceled Dark Knight Coaster was supposed to be built on. The same year, the "Mr. Six's" portion of Mr. Six's Splash Island was dropped, effectively renaming the area to Splash Island. In late August 2011, it was announced that Goliath would be coming for the 2012 season. Simultaneously, it was announced that Shipwreck Falls, a water ride located in the North End of the park, would be closing to make way for this attraction. The 2012 season saw the opening of Goliath in the CrackAxle Canyon section of the park as well as a new restaurant in the same area known as JB's Smokehouse. A month before opening day in 2013, Catapult was unexpectedly removed and scrapped. In May of that same year, a new water ride opened in Hurricane Harbor known as Bonzai Pipelines. At the conclusion of the 2013 season, Taz's DareDevil Dive was closed to make room for New England SkyScreamer, and Twister, an inverting ride located in Rockville, was also removed. At the time of its opening in 2014, New England SkyScreamer was the world's largest swing ride at 408 feet in height. The SkyWay attraction closed forever at the conclusion of the 2014 season.

On July 20, 2014, Cyclone closed forever. Construction signs were quickly put up, and during August of the same year, it was announced that Rocky Mountain Construction would transform the ride into a steel hybrid coaster, which would include three inversions and a steeper drop. Wicked Cyclone opened in May 2015. The 2016 season saw the addition of two new attractions: Fireball and Superman: The Ride. Fireball, a Larson Loop attraction, was installed in the former location of Twister. Bizarro was transformed back into Superman, including a new red track color and other effects. In 2017, The Joker, a 4D FreeFly coaster, was installed on the former site of SplashWater Falls, which closed in 2016. MindEraser, the park's SLC received new trains with an updated restraint style. Also during the 2017 season, Superman: The Ride had a limited run of offering Oculus Rift goggles to enhance the ride experience. Buzzsaw closed at the end of 2017. Harley Quinn Spinsanity was installed for the 2018 season, opening in May of that year. To make room for it, the Tea Cups were moved to the former location of Buzzsaw and is now classified as an attraction in Rockville. The South End was transformed into Gotham City, also seeing the transformation of Mind Eraser into The Riddler Revenge (which received a new green and yellow paint job). For the 2019 season, Cyborg: Hyper Drive, a spinning flat ride, was installed inside the former Hall of Justice building in DC Superheroes Adventures area of the park. This ride is the first to include the fictional character Grid, a sentient cybernetic system and the arch-nemesis of Cyborg, in Six Flags' DC character roster.

For the 2020 season, the park announced the addition of Supergirl Sky Flyer, a Zamperla Endeavour located on the site of the former Kryptonite Kollider, which closed at the end of the 2019 season. As a result of the park not opening in the 2020 season due to the COVID-19 pandemic, Supergirl Sky Flyer opened in May 2021 in the newly rethemed DC Universe area of the park, which features newly installed superhero statues and freshly painted buildings. Additionally, Goliath was left standing but not operating for the 2021 season and was removed from the park map. In July 2021, a tree fell onto Fireball during a thunderstorm, extensively damaging the attraction and leaving it closed for the rest of the season.

Attractions
Six Flags New England is home to many rides and attractions, including two World Class Roller Coasters: Wicked Cyclone and Superman: The Ride. Wicked Cyclone is the first hybrid roller coaster to hit the East Coast. It is 109 feet tall and reaches a top speed 55 mph. It includes three inversions, the world's first hangtime stall, 14 airtime hills, and the world's first double reversing banking airtime hill. Wicked Cyclone was voted the 2nd Best New Roller Coaster on the planet for the 2015 season with Fury 325 in first place. It has been in the top 30 of the Golden Ticket Awards ever since it opened. It is considered one of the best steel roller coasters in the world according to the trade magazine Amusement Today, which awarded it the prestigious Golden Ticket award in 2003, 2006, 2007, 2008 and 2009.

Roller coasters

Flat rides

Children's rides

Former attractions

Six Flags Hurricane Harbor

Hurricane Harbor is a water park located within Six Flags New England. The waterpark opened in 1997 as Island Kingdom and was rebranded Hurricane Harbor in 2003. It features a number of family-oriented rides as well as thrill rides. The most recent addition is Bonzai Pipelines added in 2013. For the 2020 season, Bonzai Beach is being expanded and renamed to Buccaneer Beach. This area is to include a larger bathhouse facility and a new pool.

Park entertainment

During the park's branding as a Six Flags in 2000, the Looney Tunes characters were added to the park. The line-up of Looney Tunes characters includes: Bugs Bunny, Daffy Duck, Tweety Bird, Sylvester, Foghorn Leghorn, Porky Pig, Petunia Pig, Pepé Le Pew, Roadrunner, Wile E. Coyote, Marvin the Martian, Taz, Granny, Lola Bunny, Elmer Fudd, Speedy Gonzales, Yosemite Sam and Gossamer.

In 2006, the park underwent a massive expansion in the entertainment department when Mark Shapiro took control of Six Flags. With this expansion, Six Flags New England has added Justice League characters, along with the Hall of Justice. In 2007, enemies of the Justice League known as the Legion of Doom came to Six Flags. This addition brought the following characters to the park: Batman, Robin, Aquaman, Wonder Woman, Hawkgirl, Green Lantern, The Flash, The Joker, The Riddler, Sinestro, Cheetah, Lex Luthor and Captain Cold. The Hall of Justice is located in the building where the Jokers Wild Card flat ride used to be, transforming it into a secret lair. Times are posted outside indicating when guests will be able to meet the characters and pose for pictures. However, the Hall of Justice building has recently become the home of Cyborg: Hyper Drive.

The park also has some of the characters from Mystery Inc including Scooby-Doo, his best friend Shaggy Rogers and his nephew Scrappy-Doo.

In the 2008 season, the Glow in the Park Parade was introduced. It was the unique brainchild of world-renowned creative director Gary Goddard and featured five custom-designed floats, 65 performers, and more than 35 support staff members and technicians. Each float was adorned with vibrant-multicolor lights that illuminate the park and surrounded the streets with custom-composed cirque-inspired music. The parade featured drummers, puppeteers, singers, dancers, and kinetic stilt walkers to create an unparalleled nighttime spectacular. The parade did not return in the 2009 season, but it did return in 2010. The parade never got to complete its full-season run in 2010. It was canceled in July after new management took over the Six Flags Corporate office.

Fright Fest 
During the month of October, the park gets transformed for its annual Halloween festival, Fright Fest. This transformation include the addition of Halloween decorations to several of its midway areas (making them Haunt Zones with roaming characters monsters), several shows and five premium haunted attractions: Nightmares, Terror Tales, The Aftermath: Zombies Revenge, Slasher Circus 3D and Midnight Mansion. In early 2009, Six Flags New England received an award within the chain for the best Fright Fest of 2008.

See also

 Incidents at Six Flags New England

References

External links

 Six Flags New England
 

 
1870 establishments in Massachusetts
Agawam, Massachusetts
Amusement parks in Massachusetts
Amusement parks opened in 1870
Buildings and structures in Hampden County, Massachusetts
New England
New England
Tourist attractions in Hampden County, Massachusetts
Water parks in Massachusetts